The following is a complete list of songs by South Korean boygroup Stray Kids, including the songs released unofficially (SKZ-Player and SKZ-Record), solo songs by the members, and songs featuring other artists. To date, the  group has released 169 songs.

Songs

Notes

See also
 Stray Kids discography
 List of songs written and produced by Bang Chan
 List of songs written and produced by Changbin

References

Stray Kids